Rajbalhat is a census town in Jangipara CD Block of Srirampore subdivision in Hooghly district in the Indian state of West Bengal. Rajbalhat can be reached conveniently by Bus from Kolkata, Haripal or Tarakeswar.

History
Tradition has it that Rajbalhat was once the capital of the Bhursut kingdom. It is said that the last fisherman king of Sanibhangar was defeated by one Chaturanan Neogi, who originally carved Bhursut kingdom out.

Krishna Roy, the son of a daughter of Chaturanan became the first Raja of Bhursut. This event took place near about 1583–84 AD. The family of Krishna Roy belonged to Phulia village.

His great grandson Pratap Narayan, a very charitable ruler, was king from 1652 to 1684 AD. He was given the title of Raja and was known as such in the court of Emperors Shah Jahan and Aurangzeb. His son was Shiv Narayan, who was succeeded by his only son Naranarayan. Either during the lifetime of Naranarayan or immediately after his death Kirtichand, the king of Bardhaman, forcibly occupied Bhursut pargana near about 1719 AD.

Geography

Location
Rajbalhat is located at 

Villages in Rajbalhat panchayat are as follows: Rajbalhat, Shib Chak, Morhal, Mukundapur, Kuliara, Jhanda, Binodbati, Chaiman Chak, Naskardanga, Gultia, Dakshin Gultia, Tripan, Nabagram, Jabni and Rahimpur.

Urbanisation
Srirampore subdivision is the most urbanized of the subdivisions in Hooghly district. 73.13% of the population in the subdivision is urban and 26.88% is rural. The subdivision has 6 municipalities and 34 census towns. The municipalities are: Uttarpara Kotrung Municipality, Konnagar Municipality, Serampore Municipality, Baidyabati Municipality, Rishra Municipality and Dankuni Municipality. Amongst the CD Blocks in the subdivision, Uttarapara Serampore (census towns shown in a separate map) had 76% urban population, Chanditala I 42%, Chanditala II 69% and Jangipara 7% (census towns shown in the map above). All places marked in the map are linked in the larger full screen map.

Demographics
As per 2011 Census of India, Rajbalhat had a total population of 16,479 of which 8,405 (51%) were males and 8,074 (49%) were females. Population below 6 years was 1,419. The total number of literates in Rajbalhat was 12,530 (83.20% of the population over 6 years).

Economics
In 1789 East India Company established a commercial residency in this village. Since then Rajbalhat is famous for handloom saris and gold ornaments.

Education
There are Two high schools, Rajbalhat High School and Rajbalhat Girls School. Both have facility for higher secondary level education.

Culture
The garh (fort) of Bhursut Raj at Rajbalhat covers about seven bighas of land and 500 bighas of land had been made a debottar property for the maintenance of the temple of Rajballavi Thakurani at Rajbalhat. There are no signs of the king's garh or palace now. Rajballavi temple is 500 years old. The name 'Rajbalhat' originated from the goddess Rajballavi.

Durga is worshipped in Jangipara, Binodbati and Rajbalhat as Rajballavi. The form of the goddess as Shweta Kali (White Kali).  She is a form of Durga.

There are more temples with Terracotta decoration in Rajbalhat village. All of them were made in 18th century. Radhakantajiu (1733) temple, Sridhar Damodar Temple (1724) decorated by terracotta, built in the 18th century are worth visiting.

Amulya Pratnashala, a craft museum in Rajbalhat, is open from 2–9 pm. It is closed on Wednesdays and the 2nd and 4th Tuesday of every month. Dulal Chandra Bhar, the father of the famous "Palm Candy" of Bengal lived in Rajbalhat.

Healthcare
Rajbalhat has a Primary Health Centre with 6 beds.

Transport

Bus

Private Bus
 10 Haripal railway station – Udaynarayanpur

Bus Route Without Number
 Rajbalhat – Howrah Station

Train
Bargachia railway station and Haripal railway station are the nearest railway stations of Rajbalhat.

References

External links 
 Travel Article on Rajbalhat
 Photos of Rajbalhat
 Picture and Information  of Rajbalhat

Towns & Villages in Jangipara block
Cities and towns in Hooghly district